The prohibition of extracting semen in vain (in Hebrew: הוצאת זרע לבטלה) is (according to Orthodox Judaism) a Biblical prohibition derived from (Genesis 38:7), this is explained in the midrash and Talmud. (A Rabbinical prohibition is different from a Biblical prohibition which is explained in the Oral Torah.) The prohibition forbids a male from intentional wasteful spilling of his semen. Unintentional wasting of seed is also a (lesser) sin according to the Oral Torah.

Biblical sources

The Hebrew Bible does not explicitly prohibit masturbation. Maimonides stated that the Tanakh does not explicitly prohibit masturbation. Jacob Milgrom acknowledged that while the rabbis condemned masturbation, "it is their enactment, not that of Scripture."

 states that any male who emits semen is considered ritually impure - whether the emission came through masturbation, nocturnal emission, or sex between married heterosexual partners. The traditional rabbinical interpretation of Leviticus 15 was that it applies to all sperm flows, including sperm flows due to masturbation. Other than this ritual impurity, no consequences or punishments are specified.

The Biblical story of Onan was interpreted by many later commentators as a source for prohibiting ejaculation outside a woman's body, including masturbation. In the story, Onan did not want to impregnate his wife (because, this being a levirate marriage, the resulting child would be considered to belong to Onan's brother Er rather than Onan), so when they had sex Onan performed coitus interruptus and caused his semen to spill on the ground. Onan was slain by God, which was deemed retribution for being "evil in the sight of the Lord" and disobeying a direct order from the Lord by being unwilling to father a child by his widowed sister-in-law. Nevertheless, opinions differ on whether his sin was denying a child to Er (which would have no implications for masturbation) or ejaculating outside the context of sex (implying that masturbation too is a sin) or both.

The halakhic prohibition on masturbation
Traditional rabbinic sources strictly prohibit male masturbation, and even activities which can lead to sexual arousal and thus ejaculation.

The Mishnah states that if a man frequently touches his penis with his hand (in order to check for ritually impure emission), his hand "ought to be cut off".

The Babylonian Talmud prohibits "emitting seed in vain", a term generally (but not only) referring to masturbation:

The same passage likens the act to murder and idolatry, and also prohibits a man from intentionally arousing himself:

The Shulchan Aruch and Kitzur Shulchan Aruch state that wasting sperm is considered to be a sin greater than any sin in the Torah. However, the Beit Shmuel commentary states that this is not literal, but rather serves to frighten man into avoiding the sin. The Arizal taught that one is obligated to fast eighty-four times to repent for the discharging of semen in vain. The Tanya contends that, in current times, one can give to charity in place of fasting. Rabbi Nachman of Breslov claimed that masturbation leads to depression, and that the effects of impure ejaculation can only be nullified through the recitation of the Tikkun Haklali.

According to Sefer haChinuch, one of the reasons for the prohibition on male homosexual sex is that sperm is destroyed for no constructive purpose.

Female masturbation

Female masturbation is not explicitly prohibited, but authorities such as Rabbi Moshe Feinstein consider female masturbation as necessarily involving forbidden "impure thoughts". However, Hida and Rabbi Tzvi Pesach Frank disagreed. Ben Ish Chai states that it is wrong because it creates evil forces (Kelipos). In any case, female masturbation does not carry the severity of male masturbation, because it does not involve the release of seed.

Situations in which halakha may permit "wasting" sperm
There is disagreement among the poskim (decisors of Jewish law) whether masturbation is an acceptable way of procuring semen for artificial insemination or in vitro fertilisation.

Some poskim rule that it is possible to masturbate to avoid arayot (forbidden relationships). Sefer Hasidim states that if a man's sexual desire is so great that he is afraid of committing a worse sin, then he is allowed to masturbate in order to avoid a worse sin, but must then perform penance by fasting or sitting in ice water.

Married couples 
Even if a wife is unable to become pregnant (e.g. infertile, old, or currently pregnant or nursing), sexual relations between a married couple are not only permitted, but required within the framework of the commandment of onah. This is despite the fact that the sperm will be "wasted" in the sense of not causing pregnancy.

Rabbinic authorities have in certain instances permitted intentional extra-vaginal ejaculation in tandem with a man's wife.

Rabbi Meir recommended a man perform coitus interruptus (דש מבפנים וזורה מבחוץ) with his wife while she is pregnant or nursing, for health reasons. For similar reasons, Rabbi Eliezer recommended coitus interruptus for a duration of 24 months after birth.

Tosafot cites the opinion of Rabbi Yitzchak (Isaac ben Samuel) who permitted an occasional exterior ejaculation with one's wife on the condition that one does not accustom himself to always doing so, as this is not considered comparable to Onan, who wished to avoid impregnating Tamar entirely. This opinion is accepted as normative by Rabbeinu Asher, Arba'ah Turim, Sefer HaAguddah, Maharsha, Bayit Chadash, Eliyah Rabbah, and some other authorities.

A more explicit permissive stance is that of the tosafist rabbi Isaiah di Trani the Elder:

Rabbi Isaiah the Elder's view is likewise echoed by his descendant, rabbi Isaiah di Trani the Younger.

Rabbi Eleazar of Worms permits any activity with one's wife necessary to "quiet (lit. seat)" his desire.

Non-Orthodox movements 

Reform and Reconstructionist rabbis have decided on more liberal conclusions. Reconstructionist Rabbi Alexis Roberts maintains that masturbation is "harmless, natural and healthy. It may provide release and pleasure, as well as self-knowledge that is useful for pleasurable sex with a partner. It may make it easier for young people to have sexual release in the years when they are too young for a mature, committed, loving relationship." Reform Rabbi Jonathan Stein, in a proposed schema for normative Reform evaluation of different sexual activities, proposed that masturbation be considered "mutar", a term generally translated as "permissible", but which he renders as "tolerable". Rabbi Walter Jacob, writing on behalf of the Reform responsa committee, asserts, "Although the statements of tradition are very clear, we would take a different view of masturbation, in the light of current psychological thought. Masturbation should be discouraged, but we would not consider it harmful or sinful."

See also 

 
 Religious views on masturbation
 Portnoy's Complaint
 Sacred Sperm
 Sexuality in Judaism

References 

Masturbation
Masturbation
Religious views on masturbation